Ewald Körner (20 January 1926 in Nejdek, Czechoslovakia –11 September 2010 in Bern) was a Czechoslovakian-German-Swiss clarinetist and conductor.

Life 
Körner was born in Sudetenland and studied piano and clarinet at the Deutsche Musikhochschule in Prague as well as conducting with Joseph Keilberth. After military service he was clarinetist at the Theater Magdeburg from 1946 to 1948. From 1948 to 1950 he studied conducting at the Hochschule für Musik, Theater und Medien Hannover. From 1951 to 1960 he was a solo repetiteur and later second Kapellmeister at Staatstheater Braunschweig. In 1956 he founded the Jeunesses Musicales Orchestra in Braunschweig. He came to Bern in 1960 as operetta conductor and worked from 1963 to 1991 as first conductor at the Stadttheater. During this time he conducted more than 103 premieres, including that of François Pantillon's Die Richterin in 1991. Körner was a permanent guest conductor of the Slovak Philharmonic. For many years he also conducted the International Opera Studio Lausanne and the conducting course of the Hochschule der Künste Bern. His students include Ludwig Wicki, Christian Henking and Kaspar Zehnder.

Bibliography

References

External links 
 Ewald Körner on Arkivmusic.com
 Ewald Körner in Who's who
 Tod des Berner Dirigenten Ewald Körner 

1926 births
2010 deaths
People from Nejdek
Sudeten German people
German classical clarinetists
German conductors (music)
German male conductors (music)